Mavisdale is an unincorporated community in Buchanan County, Virginia, United States. Mavisdale has a post office with ZIP code 24627.

History
Mavisdale may have been first known as Maize Dale, meaning "corn valley". The post office at Mavisdale was established in 1938.

References

Unincorporated communities in Buchanan County, Virginia
Unincorporated communities in Virginia